Lansing Municipal Airport  is a public airport located  south of Chicago, in Lansing, a village in Cook County, Illinois, United States. It is owned by the Village of Lansing.

Although most U.S. airports use the same three-letter location identifier for the FAA and IATA, Lansing Municipal Airport is assigned IGQ by the FAA but has no designation from the IATA.

The airport is home to a number of flight schools and is a hub for student pilots.

Facilities and aircraft 
It also houses a blimp base which launches 1/4 of the blimps that cover Chicago sporting events.
 
For the 12-month period ending June 30, 2020 the airport totaled 60,000 aircraft operations, an average of 164 per day: 91% general aviation and 9% air taxi. For the same time period, there were 53 aircraft based at this airport: 44 single engine and 2 multi-engine airplanes, 5 helicopters, 1 glider, and 1 ultralight.

Ford Hangar

The Ford Hangar, located at the Lansing Municipal Airport in Lansing, Illinois, is an airplane hangar built beginning in 1926 and completed by early January 1927. It was established as a historic building on the National Register of Historic Places in 1985. It was built under the direction of Henry Ford to serve as a facility to produce and display Ford Tri-Motor airplanes.

Henry Ford purchased 1400 acres of land in Lansing in 1923 to build an airport to connect southland Chicago with his factories in Detroit. Beginning June 1, 1926, work began on clearing land to build the hangar which was expected to, upon completion, hold three of Ford's Tri-Motor planes.

Architect Albert Kahn oversaw the design and construction of the building. He was Ford's chief architect and wanted to design a space that would solve a number of problems found in early hangars. He incorporated a number of innovations into the building that had not existed in airplane hangars prior to that time. Many hangars were poorly designed, temporary buildings that were not well lit. To solve this, Kahn incorporated three distinct features into the building. He used an architectural technique known as cantilevered construction that allowed the interior of the building to be open without need for columns to support the building, as well as reduce wind pressure on the building. He designed the hangar doors on the north and south side of the building to be easily moved by just one person. Operating on a wheeled track located on the inside of the building, the doors could be opened to any length by one person, regardless of wind or weather conditions. Kahn also looked to improve the overall environment of the building by incorporating as much natural light in the building as possible. As a result, he incorporated five large 15 by 18 foot window openings that, when combined with the open sliding doors, allowed for natural light to reach about 40 percent of the total floor area of the hangar.

Ford's dreams of Tri-Motor construction were hampered by the beginning of the Great Depression. He stopped making airplanes by July 1932, and rented the airport land and the hangar to his former airport manager Elmer L. Browne, and later the Hammond aviator Guy W. Amick. The hangar and the airport were acquired by the Village of Lansing in 1976 in order to qualify for federal funding. The hangar was in its original use until 2011, when it was vacated for preservation purposes. Efforts to rehabilitate the building to its original appearance are currently underway.

Incidents

On July 24, 1966, a Beechcraft Bonanza bound for Lansing Municipal Airport crashed on a nearby golf course. The pilot and all three passengers were killed. On board were professional golfer Tony Lema and his wife.
On October 14, 2004, a Cessna 172 inbound for Runway 27, at 5:57 a.m., fell short due to bad weather and poor visibility. No one was injured.
On March 9, 2007 a small plane crashed after takeoff from the airport at 7:30 pm. Two people died.
On September 10, 2012, a gyroplane crashed in a field about 170 yards south of the runway, shortly after takeoff at 11:20 pm. The pilot, who was the only person on board, was pronounced dead at the hospital shortly after the incident.
On October 5, 2019, a helicopter belonging to SummerSkyz Inc., lost its wheel, which then fell through the roof of a Lynwood, Illinois, resident's home. No one was home when the incident occurred, and no one was injured.

References

External links 
 Lansing Municipal Airport (official site)

Airports in Cook County, Illinois
National Register of Historic Places in Cook County, Illinois